LRT Klasika is a Lithuanian radio channel dedicated to culture and classical music and produced by Lithuanian National Radio and Television (LRT).

LRT Klasika is broadcast from a network of 22 FM transmitters and its programmes are also streamed on the internet.

Programming
Its programme content in 2012 was made up as follows:
 Music 64.3%
 Cultural 24.2%
 Educational 6.3%
 Religious 4.4%
 Current affairs 0.6%
 Other 0.2%

References

External links

Radio stations in Lithuania